The following is a list of reservoirs and dams, arranged by continent and country.

Africa

Algeria
 Djorf Torba Dam
 Keddara Dam
 Koudiat Acerdoune Dam
 Meraldene Dam
 boughrara Dam
 Beni Bahdel Dam
 Mafrouch Dam
 Sikak Dam
 Sidi Abdelli Dam
 Ain Tolba Dam
 Sarno Dam
 Ouizert Dam
 Bou Hanifia Dam
 Oued Mina Dam
 Ain Ferrah Dam
 Al Dahmouni Dam
 Colonel Bougara Dam
 Bakhadda Dam
 Maghaila Dam
 Deurdeur Dam
 Ghrib Dam
 Harraza Dam
 Ouled Melouk Zedin Dam
 Sidi Mhamed Ben Taiba Dam
 Bni Boutab Dam
 Sidi Yacoub Dam
 Gargar Dam
 Kerrada Dam
 Oued Kramis Dam
 Boukerdine Dam
 Bouroumi Dam
 Ladrat Dam
 Oued Isser's Dam
 Hamiz Dam

Angola
 Calueque Dam
 Cambambe Dam
 Capanda Dam
 Gove Dam
 Lauca Dam
 Lomaum Dam
 Ruacana Dam

Benin
 Dieguoro Dam
 Ilauko Dam

Botswana

Burkina faso
 Bagre Dam
 Kompienga Dam

Cameroon 
 Edea Dam
 Lagdo Dam
 Lom Pangar Dam
 Maga Dam
 Song Loulou Dam

Cape Verde 
 Poilão Dam

Democratic Republic of Congo 
 Boyoma fall
 Great Inga Dam
 Inga Dam 1, 2, 3, 4
 Katende Dam
 Lubilash fall
 Nzilo Dam
 Ruzizi Dam 1
 Ruzizi Dam 2
 Ruzizi Dam 3
 Ruzizi Dam 4
 Tshala Dam
 Tshopo dam
 Zongo Dam 1, 2

Egypt 
 Aswan Dam and Lake Nasser
 Aswan Low Dam

Equatorial Guinea 
 Djibloho Dam

Eritrea
 Mai Nefhi
 Toker Dam

Ethiopia 

 Beles
 Fincha
 Gilgel Gibe I Dam
 Gilgel Gibe III Dam
 Grand Ethiopian Renaissance Dam
 Kessem Dam
 Koka
 Tekezé Dam
 Tendaho Dam

Gabon 
 Bongolo Dam
 Grand Poubara Dam

Ghana 
 Akosombo Dam - Lake Volta
 Barekese Dam
 Bosumtwi Dam
 Bui Dam
 Kpong Dam
 Mampong Dam
 Owabi Dam
 Tono Dam
 Weija Dam

Guinea
 Amaria Dam
 Banieya Dam
 Garafiri Dam
 Kale Dam

Ivory Coast
 Buyo Dam
 Kossou Dam
 Taabo Dam

Kenya 

Masinga dam-R Tana

Lesotho 
 Katse Dam
 Mohale Dam
 Metolong Dam
 Muela Dam

Libya 
 Wadi Ghan Dam
 Wadi Kaam Dam
 Wadi Lebda Dam
 Wadi Mejenin Dam
 Wadi Qattara Dam
 Wadi Wishka Dam

Madagascar
 Antelomita Dam
 Ambilivily Dam
 Amboromalandy Dam
 Andekaleka Dam
 Andilamena B2 Dam
 Andilamena B3 Dam
 Andranobe Dam
 Antanifotsy Dam
 Antelomita Dam
 Mandraka Dam
 Mantasoa Dam
 Morafeno Dam
 Sahamaloto Dam
 Tsiazompaniry Dam

Malawi
 Chitete Dam
 Kamuzu Dam I Dam
 Kamuzu Dam II Dam
 Kapichira Dam
 Lunyangwa Dam
 Mpira-Balaka Dam
 Mudi Dam
 Mulunguzi Dam
 Nankhuna Dam
 Nkhula B Dam

Mali
 Félou Falls Weir
 Gouina Weir
 Manantali Dam
 Sélingué Dam

Mauritania 
 Diama Dam
 Foum Gleita Dam

Mauritius 
 Eau Bleue Reservoir
 La Ferme Reservoir
 La Nicolière Reservoir
 Mare aux Vacoas
 Mare Longue Reservoir
 Midlands Dam
 Piton du Milieu Reservoir
 Tamarind Falls Reservoir
 Valetta Reservoir

Morocco 
 Aït Ouarda Dam
 Al Massira Dam
 Al Wahda Dam
 Allal al Fassi Dam
 Bin el Ouidane Dam
 Daourat Dam
 Hassan I Dam
 Hassan II Dam
 Idriss I Dam
 Imfout Dam
 Mohamed V Dam
 Tanafnit El Borj Dam
 Youssef Ibn Tachfin Dam

Mozambique 
 Cahora Bassa Dam
 Massingir Dam
 Mphanda Nkuwa Dam

Namibia
 Avis Dam
 Bondels Dam
 Friedenau Dam
 Hardap Dam
 Naute Dam
 Oanob Dam
 Olushandja Dam
 Omatako Dam
 Omatjenne Dam
 Swakoppoort Dam
 Von Bach Dam

Niger
 Kandadji Dam

Nigeria 
 Kainji Dam
 Goranyo Dam

Republic of the Congo
 Imboulou Dam

Rwanda
 Nyabarongo Dam
 Rusumo Dam

Senegal
 Diama Dam

Sierra Leone
 Bumbuna Dam
 Guma Dam

South Africa

Swaziland
 Maguga Dam

Tanzania 
 Hombolo Dam
 Kidatu Dam
 Kihansi Dam
 Mtera Dam
 Nyumba ya Mungu Dam

Togo 
 Nangbeto Dam

Tunisia
 Kasserine Dam
 Sidi el Barrak Dam
 Sidi Salem Dam

Uganda 
 Adekokwok Hydroelectric Power Station
 Ayago Power Station
 Bujagali Power Station
 Isimba Power Station
 Karuma Power Station
 Kiira Power Station
 Nalubaale Power Station

Zambia 
 Kariba Dam

Zimbabwe 

 Bangala Dam
 Gwenoro Dam
 Kariba Dam
 Lake Chivero
 Lake Mutirikwe
 Manjirenji Dam
 Manyuchi Dam
 Mutange Dam 
 Ngondoma Dam
 Osborne Dam
 Ruti Dam
 Tokwe Mukorsi Dam

Asia

Central

Kazakhstan
 Bukhtarma Dam
 Chardara Dam
 Kapshagay Dam
 Kyzyl-Agash Dam
 Kyzylbulak Dam
 Kyzylkungei Dam
 Medeu Dam
 Moinak Dam
 Shulbinsk Dam
 Tunkuruz Dam
 Ust-Kamenogorsk Dam

Kyrgyzstan

 At-Bashy Dam
 Kambar-Ata-2 Dam
 Kürpsay Dam
 Shamaldy-Say Dam
 Tash-Kömür Dam
 Toktogul Dam
 Üch-Korgon Dam

Tajikistan 
 Baipaza Dam
 Farkhad Dam
 Golovnaya Dam
 Kayrakkum Dam - Kayrakkum Reservoir
 Nurek Dam
 Rogun Dam
 Sangtuda 1 Dam
 Sangtuda 2 Dam
 Usoi Dam

Turkmenistan
 Iran–Turkmenistan Friendship Dam
 Tuyamuyun Hydro Complex

Uzbekistan
 Abdulkhan Bandi Dam
 Andijan Dam
 Farkhad Dam
 Tuyamuyun Hydro Complex
 Kurgantepa Reservoir

Eastern

China

Hong Kong

Japan 

 Kurobe Dam, Toyama, tallest in the country
 Tokuyama Dam, largest dam in the country and creates the largest reservoir

North Korea 
 Huichon Dam
 Hwanggang Dam
 Imnam Dam
 Nampo Dam
 Songwon Dam
 Sup'ung Dam
 Taepyongman Dam
 Unbong Dam
 Wiwon Dam
 Yongnim Dam

South Korea
 Andong Dam
 Chungju Dam
 Daecheong Dam
 Gongsan Dam
 Hantangang Dam
 Hwacheon Dam
 Imha Dam
 Inje Dam
 Peace Dam
 Soyang Dam
 Uiam Dam
 Yangsang (Sangbu) Dam

Taiwan

Southeast

Brunei
 Benutan Dam
 Imang Dam
 Kagu Dam
 Mengkubau Dam
 Tasek Dam
 Ulu Tutong Dam

Burma

Cambodia 
 Cheay Areng Dam
 Lower Se San 2 Dam
 Lower Sre Pok 2 Dam
 O Chum 2 Hydropower Dam
 Sambor Dam
 Stung Battambang 1 Dam
 Stung Sen Dam
 Stung Treng Dam

East Timor
 Gariuai Dams

Indonesia 
 Batujai Dam, Lombok, West Nusa Tenggara
 Batutegi Dam, Tanggamus, Lampung
 Bili-bili Dam, Gowa, South Sulawesi
 Cacaban Dam, Tegal, Central Java
 Cirata Dam, Purwakarta, West Java
 Gajah Mungkur Dam, Wonogiri, Central Java
 Gondang Dam, Lamongan, East Java
 Jatigede Dam, Sumedang, West Java
 Jatiluhur Dam, Purwakarta, West Java
 Kedungombo Dam, Grobogan, Central Java
 Riam Kanan Dam, Banjar, South Kalimantan
 Saguling Dam, Bandung, West Java
 Sempor Dam, Kebumen, Central Java
 Sigura-gura Dam, North Tapanuli, North Sumatera
 Soedirman Dam, Banjarnegara, Central Java
 Sutami Dam, Malang, East Java
 Tilong Dam, Kupang, East Nusa Tenggara
 Wadaslintang Dam, Kebumen, Central Java
 Wonorejo Dam, Tulungagung, East Java

Laos

Malaysia 
 Air Itam Dam
 Babagon Dam
 Bakun Dam
 Batang Ai Dam
 Batu Dam
 Bekok Dam
 Beris Dam
 Betotan Dam, Sandakan
 Bukit Merah Dam
 Chenderoh Dam
 Kenyir Dam
 Kinta Dam, Perak
 Klang Gates Dam
 Layang Dam
 Lebam Dam
 Linggiu Dam
 Machap Dam
 Mengkuang Dam
 Murum Dam
 Pedu Lake
 Pergau Dam
 Sembrong Dam
 Semenyih Dam
 Sultan Iskandar Dam
 Tasik Subang Dam
 Teluk Bahang Dam
 Temenggor Dam
 Ulu Jelai Dam

Philippines 
 Agus I Dam 
 Agus II Dam 
 Agus III Dam (proposed)
 Agus IV Dam 
 Agus V Dam 
 Agus VI Dam 
 Agus VII Dam 
 Agusan Dam
 Ambuklao Dam
 Angat Dam
 Aragon Dam
 Binga Dam
 Buhisan Dam
 Bustos Dam
 Caliraya Dam
 Calumpang Diversion Dam
 Canili-Diayo Dam
 Casecnan Dam
 Ipo Dam
 Kaliwa Low Dam (proposed)
 La Mesa Dam
 Labasin Dam
 Laiban Dam (proposed)
 Lumot Dam
 Magat Dam
 Molino (Prinza) Dam
 Pantabangan Dam
 Pasa Dam
 Pulangi Dam
 San Roque Dam
 Wawa Dam

Singapore

Thailand 
 Bhumibol Dam
 Chao Phraya Dam
 Chulabhorn Dam
 Hua Na Dam
 Huai Kum Dam
 Kaeng Krachan Dam
 Kaeng Suea Ten Dam
 Lam Phra Phloeng Dam
 Lam Takhong Dam
 Mae Ngat Somboon Chon Dam
 Mae Wong Dam
 Nam Phong Dam
 Pa Sak Jolasid Dam
 Pak Mun Dam
 Rasi Salai Dam
 Sirikit Dam
 Sirindhorn Dam
 Srinagarind Dam
 Tha Thung Na Dam
 Ubol Ratana Dam
 Vajiralongkorn Dam

Vietnam
 Buôn Kuốp Dam
 Đa Nhim Dam
 Hàm Thuận – Đa Mi Dams
 Hòa Bình Dam
 Lai Châu Dam
 Na Hang Dam
 Sơn La Dam
 Thác Mơ Dam
 Trị An Dam
 Trung Sơn Dam
 Yali Falls Dam

South

Afghanistan

Bangladesh 
 Kaptai Dam

Bhutan
 Tala Dam

India

Nepal
 Bhote Koshi Dam
 Chilime Dam
 Kaligandaki A Dam
 Koshi Barrage
 Kulekhani Dam
 Mai Dam
 Sunkoshi Dam
 Upper Karnali Dam
 Upper Tamakoshi Dam
 West Seti Dam

Pakistan 

 Tarbela Dam
 Mangla Dam
 Khanpur Dam
 Dasu Dam
 Sabakzai Dam
 Mirani Dam
 Rawal Dam
 Gomal Zam Dam
 Hub Dam

Sri Lanka

Western

Armenia
 Meghri Dam

Azerbaijan

 Agstafachay Dam
 Aras Dam
 Khanbulanchay Dam
 Khoda Afarin Dam
 Mil Mugim Dam
 Mingachevir Dam - Mingachevir reservoir
 Sarsang Dam - Sarsang reservoir 
 Shamkir Dam - Shamkir reservoir 
 Shamkirchay Dam
 Takhtakorpu Dam
 Varvara Dam
 Vileshchay Dam
 Yenikend Dam - Yenikend reservoir

Iran

Iraq

Israel
 Degania Dam
 Yeruham Dam

Jordan 
 Al-Wehda Dam
 Jawa Dam
 King Talal Dam
 Mujib Dam

Saudi Arabia 
 Al Lith Dam
 Baysh Dam
 Fatima Dam
 Hali Dam
 Jizan Dam
 King Fahad Dam
 Murwani Dam
 Najran Valley Dam
 Rabigh Dam

Syria
 Baath Dam
 Halabiye Dam
 Hassakeh East Dam
 Hassakeh South Dam
 Hassakeh West Dam
 Tabqa Dam
 Tishrin Dam

United Arab Emirates
 Al Rafisah Dam
 Hatta Dam
 Wadi Shi Dam
 Shawka Dam 
 Wadi Ham Dam
 Wadi Al-Beeh Dam

Yemen
 Marib Dam

Asia-Pacific

French Polynesia
 Faatautia (Hita'a) Dam
 Tahinu Dam
 Tevaiohiro Dam
 Titaaviri Dam
 Vaihiria Dam
 Vainavenave Dam
 Vaitapaa Dam
 Vaite Dam
 Vaituoru Dam

Samoa
 Afulilo Dam

Europe

Albania
 Banjë Dam
 Fierza Dam
 Koman Dam
 Moglicë Dam
 Shkopet Dam
 Skavica Dam
 Ulëz Dam
 Vau i Dejës Dam

Andorra
 Engolasters Dam - Lake Engolasters

Austria

Belarus
 Grodno Dam

Belgium
 Gileppe Dam

Bosnia and Herzegovina
 Bočac Dam
 Buk Bijela Dam
 Buško Lake
 Čapljina Dam
 Glavatičevo Dam
 Grabovica Dam
 Grančarevo Dam (Trebinje)
 Jablanica Dam
 Jajce Dam
 Konjic Dam
 Mostarsko Blato Dam
 Pale Dam
 Rama Dam
 Salakovac Dam
 Foča Dam
 Višegrad Dam
 Župica Lake

Bulgaria

Croatia 
 Čakovec Dam
 Dubrava Dam
 Dubrovnik Dam
 Gojak Dam
 Golubić Dam
 Jaruga Dam
 Krčić Dam
 Miljacka Dam
 Ozalj Dam
 Peruća Dam - Peruća Lake
 Roški Slap Dam
 Senj Dam
 Sklope Dam - Lake Krušćica
 Varaždin Dam
 Velebit Dam
 Vinodol Dam
 Zakučac Dam
 Zeleni Vir Dam

Cyprus

Czech Republic

Denmark
 Alroe Dam
 Denmark Dam
 Kaloe Dam
 Qorlortorsuaq Dam, Greenland
 Rømø Dam
 Tangevaerket Dam

Estonia 
 Narva Reservoir (shared with Russia)

Faroe Islands 
 Lake Eiði

Finland 
 Imatra Dam
 Isohaara Dam
 Jylhama Dam
 Kalajärvi Dam - Kalajärvi Reservoir
 Kaltimo Dam
 Kuurna Dam
 Lokka Dam - Lokka Reservoir
 Melo Dam
 Ossauskoski Dam
 Pamilo Dam
 Petajaskoski Dam
 Porttipahta Dam
 Puntarikoski Dam
 Seitakorva Dam
 Tainionkoski Dam
 Taivalkoski Dam
 Uljua Dam - Uljua Reservoir
 Valajaskoski Dam
 Vanttauskoski Dam
 Venetjoki Reservoir

France

Georgia 
 Inguri Dam
 Khrami Dam
 Khudoni Dam
 Ladzhanuri Dam
 Namakhvani Dam
 Samtskhe-Javakheti Dam
 Tvishi Dam
 Vardnili Dam
 Zhinvali Dam
 Zhoneti Dam

Germany

Greece
 Kastraki Dam
 Katsiki Dam
 Kremasta Dam
 Marathon Dam
 Mesochora Dam
 Mornos Dam
 Plastiras Dam
 Stratos Dam
 Sykia Dam
 Thisavros Dam
 Kofini dam

Hungary 
 Fehervarcsurgoi Dam
 Markazi Dam
 Rakacai Dam
 Tisza Dam, Lake Tisza

Iceland 
 Blanda Dam
 Blöndulón
 Kárahnjúkar Hydropower Plant
 Sigöldulón
 Þórisvatn

Ireland 
 Ardnacrusha
 Carrigadrohid
 Cathaleen's Fall
 Cliff
 Golden Falls
 Inniscarra Dam
 Leixlip lake
 Poulaphouca Reservoir
 Turlough Hill

Italy 
 Alpe Gera Dam
 Cancano Dam
 Chiotas Dam
 Cingino Dam
 Corbara Dam
 Frera (Belviso) Dam
 Gleno Dam
 Lei Dam
 Piastra Dam
 Place Moulin Dam
 Ponte Cola Dam - Lake Val Vestino
 Punt dal Gall Dam
 Santa Giustina Dam
 Speccheri Dam
 Subiaco Dams
 Vajont Dam
 Val di Stava Dam

Latvia
 Aiviekste Dam
 Daugavpils Dam
 Ķegums Dam
 Pļaviņas Dam
 Riga Dam

Lithuania 
 Elektrėnai Reservoir
 Kaunas Reservoir

Luxembourg 
 Esch-sur-Sûre Dam
 Vianden Pumped Storage Plant

Moldova
 Dubăsari Dam
 Stânca-Costeşti Dam

Montenegro
 Mratinje Dam

Netherlands 
 Afsluitdijk
 Delta Works
 Haringvlietdam
 Hartelkering
 Oosterscheldekering
 Philipsdam
 Sloedam
 Zuiderzee Works

North Macedonia
 Boškov Dam
 Čebren Dam
 Kozjak Dam
 Spilje Dam, Lake Debar
 Tikveš Dam
 Vrutok Dam

Norway 
 Abo Dam
 Aura Dam
 Aurland Dam
 Bratsberg Dam
 Brokke Dam
 Byrte Dam
 Cårrujavrit Dam
 Evanger Dam
 Finndøla Dam
 Fortun Dam
 Glomfjord Dam
 Hakavik Dam
 Hammeren Dam
 Hardeland Dam
 Hjartdøla Dam
 Hylen Dam
 Kjofossen Dam
 Kvilldal Dam
 Lassa Dam
 Little Dam
 Løkjelsvatnet
 Lysebotn Dam
 Mår Dam
 Matre Dam
 Mauranger Dam
 Melkefoss Dam
 Nea Dam
 Nes Dam
 Nore Dam
 Nygårds Dam
 Paatsjoki Dam
 Rana Dam
 Ringedals Dam
 Såheim Dam
 Saurdal Dam
 Sildvik Dam
 Sima Dam
 Skogfoss Dam
 Storglomvatn Dam
 Svartevatn Dam
 Svartisen Dam
 Svelgfoss Dam
 Svorkmo Dam
 Tjodan Dam
 Tokke Dam
 Tonstad Dam
 Tunnsjødal Dam
 Tyin Dam
 Tyssedal Dam
 Vamma Dam
 Vatnedalen Dam
 Vemork Dam
 Vinje Dam
 Virdnejávri Dam, Virdnejávri

Poland

Portugal

Romania

Russia

Serbia

Kosovo:
 Badovc Dam
 Batlava Dam
 Gazivoda (Ujman) Dam 
 Prilepnica Dam
 Radoniqi Dam

Slovakia 
 Gabčíkovo Dam on river Danube
 Liptovská Mara on river Váh
 Orava (reservoir)
 Sĺňava on river Váh
 Starina reservoir
 Tajchy artificial water reservoirs in the Štiavnica Mountains
 Veľká Domaša on river Ondava
 Zemplínska Šírava on river Laborec

Slovenia 
 Ajba Dam
 Avče Dam
 Blanca Dam
 Boštanj Dam
 Dravograd Dam
 Markovci Dam
 Mavčiče Dam
 Medvode Dam
 Moste Dam
 Podselo Dam
 Solkan Dam
 Vuhred Dam
 Zlatoličje Dam

Spain 

 Aldeadávila Dam
 Alcántara Dam
 El Atazar Dam
 Entrepeñas
 Itoiz
 Riaño
 Salime
 Talarn Dam
 Tous
 Yesa Reservoir

Sweden
 Älvkarleby Dam
 Ebbe Dam
 Harsprånget Dam
 Hojum Dam
 Olidan Dam
 Porjus Dam
 Suorva
 Trängslet Dam

Switzerland

Turkey

United Kingdom

North and Central America

Belize
Chalillo Dam

Canada

Costa Rica 
 Lake Arenal
 Lake Cachí
 Presa Sangregado Dam
 Reventazón Dam

Cuba
 Canasí Dam
 Chalons Dam
 Hanabanilla Dam
 Jibacoa Dam
 La Yaya Dam
 Lebrije Dam
 Nuevo Mundo Dam
 Melones Dam
 Porvenir Dam
 Zaza Dam

Dominican Republic

El Salvador
Cerrón Grande Dam

Guatemala
Aguacapa Dam
Chixoy Dam
Jurún Marinalá Dam
Las Vacas Dam
Los Esclavos Dam
Santa María Dam
Xacbal Dam
Xalalá Dam

Haiti 
Péligre Dam

Honduras
 El Cajón
 Francisco Morazan

Jamaica
Hermitage Dam
Mona Dam Mona Dam
Rio Beuno Dam
Rio Cobre Dam

Mexico 
 Adolfo Ruiz Cortines Dam
 Aguamilpa Dam
 Álvaro Obregón Dam
 Amistad Dam
 Angostura Dam
 Cerro de Oro Dam
 Chicoasén Dam
 El Cajón Dam
 Emilio López Zamora dam
 Falcon Dam
 Huites Dam
 Infiernillo Dam
 International Diversion Dam
 La Boquilla Dam
 La Yesca Dam
 Lago Colina Dam
 Lake Amistad Dam International Crossing
 Lázaro Cárdenas Dam
 Malpaso Dam
 Miguel Alemán Dam
 Morelos Dam
 Ojo de Agua Dam
 Peñitas Dam
 San Jerónimo Dam
 Zimapán Dam

Nicaragua
El Dorado Dam - Lake Asturias
Mancotal Dam - Lake Apanás
Tumarín Dam
Virgen Dam

Panama 
 Barro Blanco Dam
 Bayano Dam
 Bonyic Dam
 Changuinola Dam
 Fortuna Dam
 Gatun Dam
 Madden Dam
 Panama Canal

Puerto Rico 
 Carraizo Dam
 Portugues Dam

Saint Lucia 
 John Compton Dam

Trinidad and Tobago

United States

Oceania

Australia

Fiji
 Monasavu Dam
 Nadarivatu Dam
 Vaturu Dam

New Caledonia
 Néaoua Dam
 Tu Dam
 Yaté Dam

New Zealand

Papua New Guinea 
 Yonki Dam

South America

Argentina 
 Agua del Toro Dam
 Alicurá
 Arroyito
 Arroyo Corto Dam
 Blas Brisoli Dam
 Caracoles Dam
 Casa de Piedra Dam
 Cerro Pelado Dam
 Chocón
 El Cajón Dam
 Ingeniero Ballester Dam
 Jorge Cepernic Dam
 La Viña Dam
 Loma de la Lata Dam
 Los Caracoles Dam
 Los Molinos
 Mari - Menuco Dam
 Néstor Kirchner Dam
 Pichi Picún Leufú
 Piedra del Aguila
 Planicie Banderita Dam
 Portezuelo Dam
 Punta Negra Dam
 Quebrada de Ullúm Dam
 Salto Grande (shared with Uruguay)
 San Roque
 Yaciretá Dam (shared with Paraguay)

Bolivia 
 Inkachaka Dam
 Milluni Lake
 Misicuni Dam
 Warawara Lake (Cochabamba)

Brazil

Chile 
 Aromos
 Calabocillo
 Cogotí
 Colbún
 Convento Viejo
 Digua
 El Yeso
 La Invernada
 La Paloma
 Lago Laja
 Laguna del Maule
 Machicura
 Melado
 Pangue
 Polcura
 Puclaro
 Ralco
 Rapel
 Recoleta
 Santa Juana
 Vega Larga

Colombia
 Alberto Lleras Dam
 Calima Lake
 Chingaza Dam
 El Quimbo Dam
 Guaicaramo Dam
 Ituango Dam
 La Esmeralda Dam
 Miel I Dam
 Porce III Dam
 Punchiná Dam
 Salvajina Dam
 Sogamoso Dam

Ecuador
 Mazar Dam
 Paute Dam

French Guiana
 Petit-Saut Dam

Guyana
 Amaila Dam

Paraguay 
 Itaipu Dam (shared with Brazil)
 Yaciretá Dam (shared with Argentina)

Peru 
 Antamina Tailings Dam
 Limon Dam
 Upamayu Dam

Suriname 
 Afobaka Dam
 Brokopondo Reservoir

Uruguay 
 Salto Grande (shared with Argentina)

Venezuela 
Caruachi Dam
Guri Dam
Macagua Dam
Tocoma Dam

See also 
 List of reservoirs by volume
 List of reservoirs by surface area
 List of largest dams
 List of world's tallest dams
 List of hydropower stations in Africa
 List of lakes